FC Monthey is an association football club from Monthey, Switzerland. The club plays in the 1. Liga Classic which is in the fourth tier of Swiss football. FC Monthey has played one season in the Swiss premier division Serie A in 1930–31.

References 

Football clubs in Switzerland
Association football clubs established in 1910
Sport in Valais
Monthey
1910 establishments in Switzerland